The Posavje District was an administrative division of the Independent State of Croatia. It was made of the kotars of Brod, Županja, Brčko, Derventa, Gradačac and Bijeljina. Its capital was in Brod.

It had a population of 498,398 people in 1941. It had an area of 5,554 square kilometres.

Prefects
 Vladimir Sabolić (1941 – June 1943)
 Muhamed Omerović (June 1943 – 1944)
 Dragutin Urumović (1944–1945)

References

Independent State of Croatia